The 2000 IIHF Asian Oceanic Junior U18 Championship was the 17th edition of the IIHF Asian Oceanic Junior U18 Championship. The Division I tournament took place between 17 and 20 February 2000 in Changchun City, China and the Division II tournament took place between 25 and 28 March 2000 in Bangkok, Thailand. The Division I tournament was won by North Korea, who claimed their second title by winning all three of their games and finishing first in the standings. Upon winning the tournament North Korea gained promotion to Division I of the 2001 IIHF World U18 Championships. South Korea and China finished second and third respectively.

In the Division II tournament New Zealand finished first and gained promotion to Division I for the 2001 competition.

Overview
The Division I tournament began on 17 February 2000 in Changchun City, China. North Korea had gained promotion to Division I after finishing first in the Division II tournament at the 1999 IIHF Asian Oceanic Junior U18 Championship. North Korea won the tournament after winning all three of their games and claimed their second title, their first coming in 1987. Following their win North Korea gained promotion for the following year to Division I of the 2001 IIHF World U18 Championships. South Korea finished second after losing one game to North Korea and China finished third after losing to North Korea and South Korea. Australia who finished last also suffered the largest defeat of the tournament against China, losing 0 – 10. Han Jong of North Korea finished as the top scorer for the tournament with five points including four goals and an assist.

The Division II tournament began on 25 March 2000 in Bangkok, Thailand. The under-18 team of Mongolia made their debut appearance at the Championships and in international competition. New Zealand won the tournament after winning two of their games and drawing their game against Chinese Taipei and gained promotion to Division I for the 2001 IIHF Asian Oceanic U18 Championship. Chinese Taipei finished second behind New Zealand on goal difference and Thailand finished third after finishing above Mongolia only on goal difference. Philip Chou of Chinese Taipei finished as the top scorer for the tournament with eight points including seven goals and an assist.

Division I

Standings

Fixtures
All times local.

Scoring leaders
List shows the top ten skaters sorted by points, then goals.

Leading goaltenders
Only the top five goaltenders, based on save percentage, who have played 40% of their team's minutes are included in this list.

Division II

Standings

Fixtures
All times local.

Scoring leaders
List shows the top ten skaters sorted by points, then goals.

Leading goaltenders
Only the top goaltenders, based on save percentage, who have played 40% of their team's minutes are included in this list.

References

External links
International Ice Hockey Federation

IIHF Asian Oceanic Junior U18 Championship
IIHF Asian Oceanic Junior U18 Championship
IIHF Asian Oceanic U18 Championships
Asian
International ice hockey competitions hosted by China
International sports competitions hosted by Thailand